Paria opacicollis, the oak parium, is a species of leaf beetle. It is found in North America.

Subspecies
These two subspecies belong to the species Paria opacicollis:
 Paria opacicollis opacicollis LeConte, 1859
 Paria opacicollis wenzeli Wilcox, 1957

References

Further reading

 

Eumolpinae
Articles created by Qbugbot
Beetles described in 1859
Taxa named by John Lawrence LeConte
Beetles of the United States